Harry Hepple (born David Matthew Hepple) is a British actor and musician.

Career
Hepple graduated from the Royal Academy of Dramatic Art in 2006. The same year he made his professional debut in Alaska at the Royal Court Theatre with Rafe Spall and Christine Bottomley.

He then appeared in Burnt by the Sun alongside Ciarán Hinds, Rory Kinnear and Michelle Dockery at the Royal National Theatre.

In June 2009, Hepple appeared in Been So Long by Ché Walker, with music by Arthur Darvill, at the Young Vic.

He has appeared on stage in theatres across the United Kingdom including the Young Vic, Live Theatre, Newcastle, the Traverse Theatre, The Bush, the Royal Court Theatre, the Menier Chocolate Factory, the Donmar Warehouse, the Noël Coward Theatre, the Shakespeare's Globe and the Royal National Theatre.

He has appeared on TV on BBC's Inspector George Gently, Hustle, Holby City and Boy Meets Girl and on E4's Misfits.

Credits

Theatre

Television

References

External links

Been So Long at the Young Vic website
Hepple's actor page at the National Theatre website

English male television actors
English male stage actors
People from Sunderland
Male actors from Tyne and Wear
Musicians from Tyne and Wear
1983 births
Living people
Alumni of RADA